Pleiomorpha is a genus of moths in the family Gracillariidae.

Species
Pleiomorpha dystacta Vári, 1961 
Pleiomorpha eumeces Vári, 1961 
Pleiomorpha habrogramma Vári, 1961  
Pleiomorpha homotypa Vári, 1961  
Pleiomorpha symmetra Vári, 1961

External links
Global Taxonomic Database of Gracillariidae (Lepidoptera)

Gracillariinae
Gracillarioidea genera